Jack Walrath (born May 5, 1946 in Stuart, Florida), American post-bop jazz 
Patricia A. Walrath (born August 11, 1941 in Brainerd, Minnesota), American politician 
Christopher A. Walrath (ca. 1830 - 1897), American merchant and politician
Arthur Walrath House